Daniel Thomas Stryzinski (born May 15, 1965) is a former American football  punter who played fourteen seasons in the National Football League. He played in Super Bowl XXXIII as a member of the Atlanta Falcons.

Originally from Vincennes, Indiana, Stryzinski has called Atlanta his home for the last 15 years. Stryzinski has a Finance and Management degree from Indiana University. After college, Stryzinski pursued his dream of playing football in the NFL and after 14 years (6 with the Atlanta Falcons) he retired. With retirement came the time and ability to pursue another passion of his, cars, and he has been in the automotive business for years now. Stryzinski is married with three children and enjoys riding his motorcycle, golfing, tennis, and deer hunting.

See also
 List of most consecutive starts and games played by National Football League players

References
1. ^ Members AutoChoice Bios - http://membersautochoice.com/about-mac/staff-bios/

External links
Official sites
Members AutoChoice - www.membersautochoice.com
CBS Sports - www.cbssports.com/nfl/players/playerpage/4341
IMDb - www.imdb.com/name/nm3005534/
NY Jets - www.newyorkjets.com/team/all_time/player/stats/736-dan-stryzinski
Pro-Football-Reference.com - www.pro-football-reference.com/players/S/StryDa20.htm

1965 births
Living people
People from Vincennes, Indiana
American football punters
Indiana Hoosiers football players
Pittsburgh Steelers players
Tampa Bay Buccaneers players
Atlanta Falcons players
Kansas City Chiefs players
New York Jets players